Franjo Giler (1 September 1907 – 20 December 1943) was a Yugoslav footballer. He was part of Yugoslavia's team at the 1928 Summer Olympics.

Club career
Born in Sremska Mitrovica, Austro-Hungary (nowadays Serbia), he was known as one of the best left wingers in Yugoslavia in the pre-World War II period.

He started playing in Građanski Sremska Mitrovica. and in 1925 he moved to HŠK Građanski Zagreb where he becomes Yugoslav First League champion in 1926 and 1928. In 1929 he suffered a major injury in a national team match against France, and in 1931 he was operated by Doctor Köln in Vienna, becoming the first Yugoslav footballer to be operated to the meniscus. In 1931 he joined SK Jugoslavija where he played until 1935 making 35 appearances and 12 goals. Afterwards he became a player/manager at another Belgrade club, FK Čukarički.

International career
He made his debut for Yugoslavia in a May 1926 friendly match against Bulgaria and earned a total of 13 caps, scoring 3 goals. His final international was a June 1932 Balkan Cup match, also against Bulgaria. He made also 2 appearances for the Yugoslavia B team, between 1927 and 1928.

Death
During the World War II, as a volksdeutscher, more precisely Croat of German origin, he was mobilised by the German authorities, but he tried to escape and join Yugoslav Partisans in the region of Srem, however he was ultimately captured by the Gestapo and shot dead in Vršac on 20 December 1943.

References

1907 births
1943 deaths
Sportspeople from Sremska Mitrovica
Croatian people of German descent
Association football midfielders
Yugoslav footballers
Yugoslavia international footballers
Olympic footballers of Yugoslavia
Footballers at the 1928 Summer Olympics
FK Srem players
HŠK Građanski Zagreb players
SK Jugoslavija players
FK Čukarički players
Yugoslav First League players
Croatian people executed by Nazi Germany
Croatian civilians killed in World War II
People executed by Nazi Germany by firearm